The Phou Khao Khouay leaf-nosed bat (Hipposideros khaokhouayensis) is a species of bat found in Laos and Vietnam. It was described as a new species in 2006. It is considered vulnerable to extinction by the IUCN.

Taxonomy and etymology
The Phou Khao Khouay leaf-nosed bat was described as a new species in 2006, based on specimens collected in central Laos in 1997 and 1998.
The authors of the 2006 paper placed it in the bicolor species group of the genus Hipposideros.
Its species name "khaokhouayensis" is a New Latin derivative of Phou Khao Khouay, the conservation area where this species was discovered.
The authors selected this name "to bring  attention  to  the  potential  importance of  the  National  Biodiversity  Conservation Areas  network  for preserving  natural  areas in Lao PDR, as they contain highly distinctive  ecosystems,  hosting  many  endemic species  such  as  this  one."
Its closest relative is the Laotian roundleaf bat; the two species have a genetic distance of 3.91–4.12%.

Description
When it was first encountered, researchers thought that it was the Laotian roundleaf bat, Hipposideros rotalis, as the two species are similar in appearance.
The bats they found, however, were echolocating at a frequency 20 kHz above that of H. rotalis, utilizing frequencies of 87–91 kHz.
In addition to its echolocation, the Phou Khao Khouay leaf-nosed bat has a smaller nose-leaf than H. rotalis.
It weighs , making it a moderate-sized species of the bicolor species group.
The fur on its back is long and brown; individual hairs are tricolored, with white bases, dark brown middles, and light brown tips.
Fur on its belly is lighter in color than the fur on its back.
Its ears are long and broad with blunt tips; they are brown in color.

Biology
Not much is known about its biology or reproduction.
While females have been encountered in February, May, and June, no pregnant females have been observed.
One female captured in May and another captured in June were lactating, though.
This species has a pair of pubic nipples in addition to its pair of thoracic nipples, a feature found in all species of the following families: Craseonycteridae, Rhinopomatidae, Megadermatidae, Rhinolophidae, and Hipposideridae.
The function of the pubic nipples could be to allow the pups to cling more securely to their mothers before they are able to fly.
Pubic nipples could also function in feeding the pup.

Range and habitat
This species was first discovered in Phou Khao Khouay National Biodiversity Conservation Area.
It has also been found near Vang Vieng, also in central Laos.
It has been documented in both disturbed and intact evergreen forests. In 2008, the species was also captured in the mangrove habitat of Cat Ba Biosphere Reserve in Vietnam.

Conservation
It is currently evaluated as vulnerable by the IUCN.
Even though it occurs in a protected conservation area in Laos, its habitat is still threatened due to lax enforcement of conservation laws.
Phou Khao Khouay habitat is threatened by deforestation and the construction of roads and buildings.

References

External links
Photos of this species

Mammals described in 2006
Bats of Southeast Asia
Hipposideros